Niel Black (26 August 1804 – 15 May 1880) was a successful  Australian colonial pastoralist and one of Australia’s early politicians, a member of the Victorian Legislative Council.

Biography 
Black was born at Kilbridemore, Cowal, Argyleshire, Scotland, the son of Archibald Black (died 1808), a farmer, and his wife Janet, née Macchananaich (Buchanan). His native language is Gaelic but he was also fluent in English.

Black sailed to Australia on board the Ariadne and docked in Port Adelaide in 1839. He had the idea of investing in Australian pastoral properties with his partner Mr Alexander Struthers Finlay, of Castle Toward, Argyleshire, Mr Thomas Steuart Gladstone, of Capenock, Dumfriesshire and Mr William Steuart of Glenormiston, Peeblesshire, Scotland. He realised the land was too expensive in Adelaide and visited Melbourne and Sydney. He decided to settle in Port Phillip because he felt it was more of a “Scotch settlement”.

He purchased a 17,612 hectare run near Lake Terang in the Western District which he named 'Glenormiston' in 1840. He also bought a run nearby called 'The Sisters' in 1844.  The partnership, which was highly remunerative after 1846, continued until 1868 when the property was divided. Black bought Gladstone's portion, now known as Mount Noorat, and resided on it until his death on 15 May 1880.

In the 1850s Black visited Scotland again, he lived there for five years where he met Grace Greenshields Leadbetter. They were married in 1857. Black and his wife had three sons, Archibald John, Steuart Gladstone and Niel Walter.

Black’s personal papers are held by the State Library of Victoria. His diaries and many letters provide insights into many aspects of life in the Western regions of Victoria in the nineteenth century. They include some revealing commentary on the way he thought land could best be acquired. His journal entry for 9 December 1839, reads:The best way [to procure a run] is to go outside and take up a new run, provided the conscience of the party is sufficiently seared to enable him without remorse to slaughter natives right and left. It is universally and distinctly understood that the chances are very small indeed of a person taking up a new run being able to maintain possession of his place and property without having recourse to such means — sometimes by wholesale — but I do not think that this is by any means common, and it its only outside that they are ever called upon to act in so brutal a manner, it, however, seems to be little thought of here as it is only done in defense of self or property … I believe, however, that great numbers of the poor creatures have wantonly fallen victims to settlers scarcely less savage though more enlightened than themselves, and that two thirds of them does not care a single straw about taking the life of a native, provided they are not taken up by the Protectors.He represented the Western Province from February 1859 to May 1880 in the Legislative Council, and was also a magistrate for the southern bailiwick. As a politician he was a staunch Conservative, and opposed the introduction of free education.

References

Journal articles 

 Clark, Ian D. "Squatters' Journals - No 43 Autumn 1989". latrobejournal.slv.vic.gov.au. Retrieved 4 July 2020.
 Black, Maggie. "The Battle for the Lands: glimpses from a squatter's correspondence - No 88 December 2011". latrobejournal.slv.vic.gov.au. Retrieved 17 August 2020.

Books 

 MacKellar, Maggie (2008). "Strangers in a Foreign Land – The Journal of Neil Black and other voices from Western District." Carlton, Vic.: The Miegunyah Press. 
 Black, Maggie (2016). Up came a squatter : Niel Black of Glenormiston, 1839–1880. Sydney, NSW: NewSouth Publishing. .

Websites 

 Ward, Russel. "Black, Niel (1804–1880)". Australian Dictionary of Biography. Melbourne University Press. ISSN 1833-7538. Retrieved 3 May 2013 – via National Centre of Biography, Australian National University.
 "Obituary - Niel Black - Obituaries Australia". oa.anu.edu.au. Retrieved 4 July 2020.
 "Black, Niel". re-member: a database of all Victorian MPs since 1851. Parliament of Victoria. Archived from the original on 7 July 2012. Retrieved 3 May 2013.
 Wilkie, Ben (8 June 2012). "Niel Black – The Pioneer Pastoralist". Benjamin Wilkie. Retrieved 4 July 2020.
 Mennell, Philip, "Black, Hon. Neil", The Dictionary of Australasian Biography, retrieved 31 July 2020 
 "Niel Black - (b. 26 Aug 1804 - d. 15 May 1880) » POI Australia". POI Australia. 25 August 1804. Retrieved 31 July 2020.
 "VHD". vhd.heritagecouncil.vic.gov.au. Retrieved 31 July 2020.
 "Glenormiston College". www.glenormiston.com.au. Retrieved 31 July 2020.
 'Black, Niel (1804-1880)' 2010. Trove, viewed 12 August 2020

External links 

 Records and Personal Papers of Niel Black, 1838-1938, [manuscript]. State Library of Victoria

Footnotes 

1804 births
1880 deaths
Members of the Victorian Legislative Council
Scottish emigrants to colonial Australia
People from Argyll and Bute
19th-century Australian politicians
Australian pastoralists
19th-century Australian businesspeople